Monica Adella Verschoor (born 18 October 1950, in The Hague) is a pop singer and pianist.
When her songs ranked number 1 in the Dutch top 40, Monica became a famous singer in the 1970s .

Biography 
Monica Verschoor was born in The Hague. Her mother from the former Dutch East Indies married in the Netherlands Jan Verschoor, French teacher.
Later, on the advice of Mrs. Talbert, she played as double bass player for several years in this orchestra. Studying Dutch in Leiden, she obtained a teaching certificate.

In 1971, with the band Monica and the voice of freedom hit the number 1 of the Dutch top 40 with the single Empty words release by Imperial Records in the Netherlands, Columbia Records in Germany, Transatlantic Records in United Kingdom,  and also in 1972 with Oscar Benton with the single All I ever need is you or Everybody is telling me] released by Imperial Records.

Later, she became both a teacher and a performing artist in all the Netherlands.
She is currently an active composer, pianist and vocalist, Her last project is an educational show for children wij gaan op reis  with Guillaume Marcenac.

Discography

Singles

Albums / collector-LP's

CD’s

Literature

References

External links 
Empty words, opname voor televisieuitzending Zuid-Afrika December 1971
Mama don’t you worry, interview met Sonja Barend

1950 births
Dutch women singers
Dutch pop pianists
Living people
21st-century pianists
21st-century women pianists